This is a list of islands in the world ordered by population, which includes all islands with more than 100,000 people. For comparison, continental landmasses are also shown, in italics. The population of the world's islands is over 730 million, approximately 11% of the world's total population. Of those, only Java (Indonesia) and Honshu (Japan) have populations over 1% of the global population.

Islands ordered by population
Due to the uncertainty of what exactly constitutes a geographic island, as opposed to an administrative region, please see comments about what is included in the figures: the statistics for some "islands" include other nearby islands.

Population over 10 million

Population 1,000,000 to 10,000,000

Population 500,000 to 1,000,000

Population 100,000 to 500,000

Peninsulas and other areas not regarded as islands

See also

Recursive islands and lakes
List of islands by area
List of islands by highest point
List of islands by population density
List of Caribbean island countries by population
List of Canadian islands by population
List of Canadian islands by area
List of countries by population
List of countries by area
List of European islands by population
List of European islands by area
List of Indonesian islands by population
List of islands of South America
List of populated islands of the Great Lakes

Notes

References

External links
UN Environment Programme Islands Directory
Most populous islands 

Lists by population
 Population
Population geography
Islands
Eurasia
Africa
Americas
Oceania